Jessie Nelson or similar spellings may refer to:

 Jessie Nelson, an American film producer, director, and writer
 Jesy Nelson (born 1991), an English singer-songwriter and former member of Little Mix
 Jesse Nelson, a member of the Exhumed Films film organization
 Jessie Nelson, keyboardist in Head Automatica

See also
 Jessica Nelson (disambiguation)